"The Four Ages of Poetry", an essay of 1820 by Thomas Love Peacock, was both a significant study of poetry in its own right, and the stimulus for the Defence of Poetry by Shelley.

Setting and tone
Much of the ‘Four Ages’ is an attack from a utilitarian standpoint on the Romantic poets with whom Peacock was closely associated, and whom indeed he defended publicly from criticism elsewhere. But, ever the parodist, Peacock's argument cut both ways. As M. H. Abrams put it, “If he was a poet who mocked at poets from a Utilitarian frame of satirical reference, he was a Utilitarian who turned into ridicule the belief in utility and the march of intellect”. Nevertheless, while humorous, Peacock's essay also raised several serious critical points.

Poetic origins
Peacock offered a mocking account of how poets originally developed a claim to be historians or moralists, seeing the first poetry as created by a bard “always ready to celebrate the strength of [the king’s] arm, being first duly inspired by that of his liquor”. As the inflater of royal ‘credit’, the poet was thus placed as precursor to contemporary speculators in paper money and financial credit.

Primitivism
"Mr Scott digs up the poachers and cattle-stealers of the ancient border.  Lord Byron cruises for thieves and pirates on the shores of the Morea….Mr Wordsworth picks up village legends from old women". Peacock concluded that the present-day poet was a regressive influence opposed to progress and development, and (herein Peacock was outdoing Jeremy Bentham himself) of no utilitarian merit whatever.

See also

References

External links

 Overview

English essays
1820 essays
Essays about poetry
Essays in literary theory